Scaevatula amancioi is a species of sea snail, a marine gastropod mollusk in the family Clavatulidae.

Distribution
This species is endemic to São Tomé and Príncipe.

References

 Rolán, E., and F. Fernandes. "Aportaciones al conocimiento de la familia Turridae Swainson, 1840 (Mollusca, Gastropoda) en las islas de Sâo Tomé y Príncipe (Golfo de Guinea)." (1992)

External links
 

amancioi
Endemic fauna of São Tomé and Príncipe
Invertebrates of São Tomé and Príncipe
Gastropods described in 1992
Taxobox binomials not recognized by IUCN